Stefan Hatos-Monty Hall Productions is a television production company responsible for producing several American game shows in the 1970s and 1980s. The company is best known for its hit series Let's Make a Deal, which aired in several company-produced iterations off and on between 1963 and 1986.

The company disbanded sometime in 1987, but the company exists as a holding company for all Hatos-Hall assets.  It is currently owned by Marcus/Glass Entertainment.

History: Let's Make a Deal

Prior to meeting and while working in 1962 on the NBC game show Your First Impression, hosted by Bill Leyden, Stefan Hatos and Monty Hall had different career paths. Hatos was a writer and producer who had worked in both television and radio and had also been a producer for Bob Hope's early television specials. Hall's American media career began in 1955 when he became a contributor for the NBC Radio Monitor program. After five years of this, he moved to Hollywood and became the host of the Merrill Heatter-produced Video Village. While hosting the series in 1962, he sold his first production (the aforementioned Your First Impression) to NBC and met Hatos, who was working on the show as a producer (Hall was executive producer).

The next year, the duo debuted the long-running Let's Make a Deal on NBC, and the show was an instant success, running in daytime on NBC and later on ABC for 13 seasons. Two weekly network primetime versions also aired, one on NBC in 1967 and one on ABC from 1969 to 1971.

The show's popularity also spawned a syndicated version, which aired weekly from 1971 to 1977 and was one of the first network game shows to do so.

Other shows

In addition to LMAD, Stefan Hatos-Monty Hall Productions also produced the 1970s hit Split Second for ABC. The series, which ran from 1972 to 1975, was the only other show the company produced that lasted more than one season.

Other game shows produced by the team included Chain Letter, Three for the Money and It's Anybody's Guess for NBC and It Pays to Be Ignorant and Masquerade Party in syndication. The last of those series was the hosting debut for Richard Dawson.

The 1980s

After a hiatus of several years, Stefan Hatos-Monty Hall Productions returned to production in the mid-1980s with a revival of Let's Make A Deal, which ran in daily syndication from 1984 to 1986. (Another daily syndicated version, which aired from 1980 to 1981, while hosted by Hall was not produced with Hatos.) After that series ended its run, Hatos and Hall revived Split Second in syndication in the fall of 1986 with Hall hosting. The company broke up following the show's cancellation.

Afterwards

Although Hatos retired from writing and producing television shows after Split Second ended in 1987, he continued to oversee the licensing agreements and was involved with the foreign versions of Let's Make a Deal until his death in 1999.

Hall was retired for the most part following the 1987 cancellation of Split Second, though he frequently made cameos related to Let's Make a Deal such as one he made as part of Good Morning America'''s 2009 game show week. Hall replaced Bob Hilton as host of a daytime Let's Make a Deal series NBC attempted in 1990 (which was produced by Dick Clark Productions) and helmed it until its 1991 cancellation and later made a cameo on a weekly primetime edition NBC aired in 2003.

For the 2009 CBS daytime series, Hall served as a consultant and Stefan Hatos-Monty Hall Productions is credited as a co-production company (much in the same way Mark Goodson's name was used on The Price Is Right'' long after his production company was dissolved). Hall has also hosted at least one game on the current version. Hall died in 2017 and the family is still involved in the production company with its current owners.

In 2021, the holding company was acquired by Glass Entertainment and Marcus Entertainment.  The joint venture also hired Monty Hall's daughter Sharon, a former Endemol Shine executive, as consultant.

References

External links
 Letsmakeadeal.com: Stefan Hatos biography

 01
Defunct film and television production companies of the United States
Entertainment companies based in California
Companies based in Los Angeles
Entertainment companies established in 1963
Mass media companies established in 1963
Mass media companies disestablished in 1987
1963 establishments in California
1987 disestablishments in California
Defunct companies based in Greater Los Angeles
Let's Make a Deal